Allen Edward Dekdebrun (May 11, 1921 – March 29, 2005) was an American Football quarterback and politician from Buffalo, New York. As a professional football player, Dekdebrun was a career journeyman, playing in the All-America Football Conference,  National Football League, Interprovincial Rugby Football Union, and Ontario Rugby Football Union, changing teams on an annual basis.  He played college football at Cornell University, where he was also a member of the Quill and Dagger society, and high school football at Burgard High School in Buffalo. He attended Columbia for his freshman year before transferring to Cornell.

In the 1950 Grey Cup, deemed the Mud Bowl, he scored the only touchdown for the winning Toronto Argonauts.

After his football career ended, Dekdebrun opened a sporting goods store in Buffalo, and also served as the town supervisor of Amherst, New York. He sought the office of Erie County executive in 1975, but lost to incumbent Edward Regan.

See also
 List of NCAA major college yearly punt and kickoff return leaders
 List of NCAA major college football yearly passing leaders

References

External links
Al Dekdebrun statistics

1921 births
2005 deaths
American football quarterbacks
Boston Yanks players
Buffalo Bisons (AAFC) players
Chicago Rockets players
Cornell Big Red football players
New York Yankees (AAFC) players
Players of American football from Buffalo, New York
Toronto Argonauts players
Montreal Alouettes players
Ottawa Rough Riders players
Ontario Rugby Football Union players
Canadian football quarterbacks